Ada is an unincorporated community in the town of Herman, Sheboygan County, Wisconsin, United States.

Description

References

External links

Unincorporated communities in Sheboygan County, Wisconsin
Unincorporated communities in Wisconsin